Alan Hale (born 1958) is an American professional astronomer, who co-discovered Comet Hale–Bopp along with amateur astronomer Thomas Bopp.

Hale specializes in the study of Sun-like stars and the search for extra-solar planetary systems, and has side interests in the fields of comets and near-Earth asteroids. He has been an active astronomer most of his life and currently serves as the president of the Earthrise Institute, which he founded, and which has as its mission the use of astronomy as a tool for breaking down international and intercultural barriers. The International Astronomical Union (IAU) has named an asteroid in Hale's honor, 4151 Alanhale, in recognition of his numerous comet observations.

Early life and career
Hale was born in 1958 in Tachikawa, Japan, where his father was serving in the United States Air Force. Four months later his father was transferred to Holloman Air Force Base outside Alamogordo, New Mexico.

Hale was raised in Alamogordo where his father retired from the Air Force and worked in civil service. In 2013 Hale said, "I refuse to say that 'I grew up there' because anyone who know me knows that I really haven’t grown up yet."
He credits several factors for inspiring his interest in science and astronomy in the 1960s: the clear night skies in Alamogordo, library books on astronomy his father gave him in the first grade, the US space program, and the original Star Trek TV series. Hale also said that as a child he was interested in other sciences as well, and he "went through a dinosaur phase when I was in 2nd grade. I knew them all. Drove my parent nuts."
 
Hale graduated from Alamogordo High School in 1976, and then served in the United States Navy from 1976 to 1983. He graduated from the U.S. Naval Academy in 1980 with a bachelor's degree in physics.
Following his Navy service he worked at the Jet Propulsion Laboratory (JPL) until 1986 as an engineering contractor for Allied Bendix Aerospace working on the Deep Space Network project, as well as on several spacecraft projects. During the 1986 Voyager 2 fly-by of Uranus, he worked with the Radio Science Experiment, using the spacecraft carrier signal to deduce information about Uranus' atmosphere and rings.

After leaving the JPL, Hale enrolled in the astronomy department of New Mexico State University,  Las Cruces, where he earned a Master's Degree and a PhD in 1989 and 1992 respectively, both in astronomy. His doctoral dissertation was published in the January 1994 issue of The Astronomical Journal.
After completing his studies at the New Mexico State University, Hale worked at the New Mexico Museum of Space History in Alamogordo as its staff astronomer and outreach education coordinator.

Earthrise Institute
In 1993 Hale founded the Southwest Institute for Space Research (SWISR), which later became the Earthrise Institute, where Hale serves as president.

Hale said "there is an entire generation that has come of age having never really seen the dark sky", so part of what he wanted to accomplish with Earthrise was "to create an environment where students could spend some nights out under a dark sky and see what it really looks like."

In 1999 Hale assembled a group of American scientists, students and educators to go on a 2 week+ trip to Iran (coinciding with a solar eclipse) where they gave talks throughout the country. Hale feels that "Science is a... universal language" and "it would be a great idea if we could use science as a tool to bring people together... to break down barriers between nations and between cultures." Hale uses the expression 'Science Diplomacy' in this context, which he says it's possible he coined. "The sky looks the same from Iran as it does from here in the US. It’s the same sky we study... Science does not know political boundaries."

This sentiment is reflected in the mission of his Earthrise Institute, which is "to use astronomy, space, and other related endeavors as a tool for breaking down international and intercultural barriers and for bringing humanity together." Earthrise's inaugural educational project was announced in a press release on March 1, 2007:

Hale remains active with the Earthrise Institute performing science outreach. For example, his "In Our Skies" column appears in the Alamogordo Daily News, in which he discusses current astronomical issues.

In 2019, Hale announced he was authoring a weekly educational series about the "small bodies" of the Solar System. The series, titled Ice and Stone 2020, features three presentations about comets and asteroids – This Week in History, Comet of the week, and a Special Topic – being released each week throughout 2020. Ice and Stone 2020 is available for free online at the websites of both the Earthrise Institute and RocketSTEM.

Discovery of Comet Hale–Bopp

Hale first spotted the comet that would come to bear his name from his home in Cloudcroft, New Mexico, where the night sky is exceptionally dark. Since 1970 Hale had observed over 200 known comets, and on the night of July 22–23, 1995, after finishing his observations of periodic Comet Clark, and while waiting for periodic Comet d'Arrest to become visible above the horizon, he "decided to pass the time by observing some deep-sky objects in Sagittarius", and pointed his Meade DS-16 telescope towards globular cluster M70. He said that he "immediately noticed a fuzzy object in the field" which had not been present when he had observed that region of the sky two weeks earlier.

After consulting his astronomical sources, and determining that the comet was likely unknown, Hale says: 

Unknown to Hale, that night Thomas Bopp was observing the same region of the sky with friends near Stanfield, Arizona. At around 11:00 pm, Bopp was observing M70 through his telescope and "noticed a fainter, fuzzy object coming into the field". Bopp and his friends determined that it was a comet, and after Bopp returned home he informed Central Bureau of his discovery.

On July 23, the IAU issued Circular 6187 to announce the joint discovery of the new comet. Per Hale, calculations indicate that Hale–Bopp likely last appeared on the order of 4000 years ago, but any record of this previous encounter had not yet been positively identified from ancient records. It has also been determined that Hale–Bopp will not return to the inner Solar System until approximately 4385.

Comet Hale–Bopp, originally labeled C/1995 O1, and sometimes called "the Great Comet of 1997", became one of the most-viewed comets in human history, and the brightest comet seen since Comet West in 1976, appearing "1000 times brighter than Comet Halley did at the same distance."

When the comet was at the peak of its brightness, Hale says he was giving talks about the comet in big cities with light-polluted night skies, so he did not get a chance "to see it all that much when it was really bright."

Regarding the press conference of the comet’s discovery, Hale praised the reporting done by “the very first reporter that broke the story of the comet’s discovery,” the Albuquerque Journal science reporter John Fleck:

As an example of the media getting it wrong, Hale told this story:

Heaven's Gate reaction

Historically linked to the discovery and first recorded appearance of Hale–Bopp is Heaven's Gate, a religious cult in San Diego led by Marshall Applewhite who preached that an alien spacecraft was following Comet Hale–Bopp. The cult members believed that transporting their souls to the spacecraft and evacuating the Earth – which was soon to be "recycled" – would permit them to achieve salvation. Applewhite and 38 followers poisoned themselves over three days in March 1997 in the belief this would allow them to pass through "Heaven's Gate" and achieve "the Evolutionary Level Above Human." The rationale for taking their lives was (and is, as of this writing) clearly detailed on the group's website which is maintained by surviving cult members.

When news broke of the Heaven's Gate mass suicides and their relation to Comet Hale–Bopp, Hale's phone "never stopped ringing the entire day." Hale did not respond until the next day, when he spoke at a press conference on the subject, only after he had researched details of the incident.

At the 20th annual convention of the Freedom From Religion Foundation (FFRF) in Tampa, Florida, in 1997 Hale was a featured speaker and discussed the suicides, calling their death pact and other religion-fostered violence "another victory for ignorance and superstition."

Speaking at the Second World Skeptics Congress in Heidelberg, Germany on July 24, 1998:

Hale said that, well before Heaven's Gate, he had told a colleague:

Media appearances
Following his discovery of Comet Hale–Bopp, Hale was in demand to speak about the comet bearing his name, and this gave him a platform to discuss Hale-Bopp as well as general astronomy and science. Hale was a guest speaker at the February 16, 1996, meeting of New Mexicans for Science and Reason (NMSR) which according to member and Science Watch host Dave Thomas "was one of our most memorable and well-attended ever." Hale spoke on "Comet Hale–Bopp: Potentials and Opportunities" and cautioned against complacency about asteroid and comet impacts on the Earth, saying that:

On February 26, 1997, Hale was the guest speaker for two public lectures sponsored by the Center for Particle Astrophysics at UC Berkeley. Hale has been a periodic guest on The Space Show, an Internet radio talk show centering on space commerce and exploration, which is also available as a podcast. On the March 19, 2002 broadcast, Hale spoke of the importance of the search for Near Earth Asteroids (NEAs) and their danger to civilization:

From 2004 to 2006 Hale was host of a weekly radio program, The Other Side of the Sky (the precursor to Earthrise Radio). On March 11, 2006, Hale was interviewed on the NMSR's Science Watch radio show in an episode called "An Hour-long visit with Dr. Alan Hale, co-discoverer of the Hale–Bopp Comet!"

Scientific skepticism advocacy
As a scientific skeptic, Hale is a periodic contributor to Skeptical Inquirer magazine. One such article, titled "An Astronomer’s Personal Statement on UFOs", appeared in the March/April 1997 edition. In the article Hale stated:

After an analysis of the claims of extraterrestrial visitation with regards to these three principles, Hale concluded:

Atheist activism
Hale is an atheist and member of the honorary board of the online group Internet Infidels which has the mission of using the Internet to promote a view that supernatural forces or entities do not exist. Hale has made his position on religion clear:

Awards and honors
In 1980 Alan Hale was awarded the Navy League of the United States prize in Applied Physics.

In 1991, years prior to his discovery of Hale–Bopp, the IAU named an asteroid, 4151 Alanhale, in Hale's honor in recognition of his numerous comet observations, stating that:

Select bibliography

Books
Everybody's Comet: A Layman's Guide to Hale–Bopp
Great Balls of Ice: A Century of Comets
the comet man (a memoir) e-book

Scientific journals
The Astronomical Journal: Dissertation published in January 1994
The International Comet Quarterly:

Popular publications
From August 2002 to January 2003, Hale wrote a weekly newspaper column for the Space Frontier Foundation entitled "In Our Skies," which has been archived online. He also wrote a monthly column entitled "Hale to the Stars." Hale currently contributes to the Alamogordo Daily News with his "In Our Skies" column, covering a variety of astronomical and spaceflight topics.

Other publications Hale has contributed to include Astronomy, Skeptical Inquirer, Free Inquiry and the McGraw-Hill Encyclopedia of Science & Technology.

Professional societies
American Astronomical Society
Sigma Pi Sigma

References

External links

 Comet Hale–Bopp Home Page at JPL
 Comet Hale–Bopp Timeline – 1997
 Alan Hale's Earthrise Institute

Date of birth missing (living people)
1958 births
Living people
Scientists from New Mexico
People from Otero County, New Mexico
New Mexico State University alumni
United States Naval Academy alumni
People from Alamogordo, New Mexico
People from Tachikawa
Critics of creationism
Critics of religions
Space advocates
20th-century atheists
21st-century atheists
Bendix Corporation people
Discoverers of comets
American atheists
American astronomers
American skeptics